Aildenafil (methisosildenafil) is a synthetic drug that is a structural analog of sildenafil (Viagra).  It was first reported in 2003, and it is not approved by any health regulation agency.  Like sildenafil, aildenafil is a phosphodiesterase type 5 inhibitor.

Aildenafil has been found as an adulterant in a variety of supplements which are sold as "natural" or "herbal" sexual enhancement products.  The United States Food and Drug Administration has warned consumers that any sexual enhancement product that claims to work as well as prescription products is likely to contain such a contaminant.

See also 
 Acetildenafil
 Nitrosoprodenafil
 Sulfoaildenafil

References

External links 

Designer drugs
PDE5 inhibitors
Sulfonamides